Ethan Gregory Peck (born March 2, 1986) is an American actor. He is the grandson of actor Gregory Peck and Greta Kukkonen, the elder Peck's first wife. In 2019, he played a young Spock in Star Trek: Discovery (2019), a role he has reprised for the television series Star Trek: Strange New Worlds (2022present).

Career
Peck had many television appearances as a young actor, including a younger Michael Kelso (played by Ashton Kutcher) in That '70s Show. In his first film role at age 9, he co-starred in the made-for-TV film Marshal Law as the son of Jimmy Smits' character. He later appeared in the 1999 movie Passport to Paris starring Mary-Kate Olsen and Ashley Olsen, and was Mary-Kate's first on-screen kiss.

Peck co-starred with Adam Rothenberg and Mariah Carey in the 2008 film Tennessee, followed by a co-starring role opposite Peter Coyote and Bebe Neuwirth in the film Adopt a Sailor. He won the award for "Best Actor" at the 2009 Sonoma International Film Festival for his portrayal of "Sailor".

From 2009 to 2010, he starred on the television series 10 Things I Hate About You on ABC Family.

In 2012, Peck played Prince Maxon for the pilot adaptation of the popular book The Selection, but was later replaced by newcomer Michael Malarkey. Neither the first nor second pilot was picked up to go to series.

In 2015, Peck became a spokesperson for fashion brand Salvatore Ferragamo and appeared in a number of print editorials representing the Italian brand. He was also featured in Coming Home to Hollywood, a short film about the brand's 100th anniversary.

In 2016, Peck starred in The Curse of Sleeping Beauty and Tell Me How I Die.

In 2017, Peck was cast in a comedy, The Honor List, alongside Meghan Rienks, Sasha Pieterse, Arden Cho and Karrueche Tran. The movie was released in 2018.

Peck portrayed Spock in the second season of Star Trek: Discovery. In May 2020 it was announced that Peck would reprise his role as Spock in a spin-off, Star Trek: Strange New Worlds.

Personal life 
Born and raised in Los Angeles, Peck is the son of Stephen Peck—a former actor, documentary filmmaker and Vietnam veteran who is president and CEO of U.S. Veterans Initiative—and abstract artist Francine Matarazzo. He is the grandson of actor Gregory Peck and his first wife, Finnish-born Greta Kukkonen. Peck attended private schools Campbell Hall and Harvard-Westlake in Studio City. He excelled in athletics and learned to play classical cello.

He has a half sister from his mother's second marriage, Marisa Matarazzo, who is a novelist and creative writing professor at Otis College of Art and Design in Los Angeles.

After high school, Peck attended the Tisch School of the Arts at New York University, where he participated in the Experimental Theater Wing for three years before leaving to pursue his acting career.

Filmography

Film

Television

Music videos

Video games

Other multimedia

References

External links
 

1986 births
Living people
American male child actors
American male film actors
American male television actors
20th-century American male actors
21st-century American male actors
Male actors from Los Angeles
Harvard-Westlake School alumni
Tisch School of the Arts alumni
American people of Finnish descent
American people of English descent
American people of Irish descent
American people of Scottish descent